Pontohedyle milaschewitchii is a species of sea slug, an acochlidian, a shell-less marine gastropod mollusk in the family Microhedylidae.

Ecology
The life cycle of all Acochlidiacea is not well known. Pontohedyle milaschewitchii lays a maximum of 40 eggs.

References

External links

 Jörger K. M., Neusser T. P. & Schrödl M. (2007). "Re-description of a female Pontohedyle brasilensis (Rankin, 1979), a junior synonym of the Mediterranean P. milaschewitchii (Kowalevsky, 1901) (Acochlidia, Gastropoda)". Bonner Zoologische Beiträge 55(3/4): 283-290. PDF.
 Jörger K. M., Neusser T. P., Haszprunar G. & Schrödl M. (2008). "Undersized and underestimated: 3D-visualization of the Mediterranean interstitial acochlidian gastropod Pontohedyle milaschewitchii (Kowalevsky, 1901)". Organisms Diversity & Evolution 8(3): 194–214. .

Microhedylidae
Gastropods described in 1901